Curves Ahead is the fifth album by the American Jazz group The Rippingtons, released in 1991 for the GRP label. This album reached #1 on Billboard's contemporary Jazz chart.

Track listing
All tracks written by Russ Freeman.
"Curves Ahead" - 5:39
"Aspen"  - 5:28
"Santa Fe Trail" - 5:14
"Take Me With You" - 5:34
"North Star" - 5:24
"Miles Away" - 5:17
"Snowbound" - 4:51
"Nature of the Beast" - 6:21
"Morning Song" - 4:09

Personnel 

 Russ Freeman – arrangements (1-9), keyboards (1-9), acoustic guitar (1, 3, 6, 7), electric guitar (1, 2, 5-8), guitar synthesizer (1, 8), horn arrangements (1, 3), bass (3-7), classical guitar (4, 9), steel-string guitar (9)
 Mark Portmann – acoustic piano (2, 4, 9), keyboards (8)
 Dave Grusin – acoustic piano (5)
 Kim Stone – bass (1, 2, 8)
 Steve Bailey – additional fretted and fretless basses (7), fretless bass (9)
  Tony Morales – drums (1-4, 6, 7, 9)
 Omar Hakim – drums (5, 8)
 Steve Reid – assorted percussion (1-9), vocals (3)
 Jeff Kashiwa – alto saxophone (1, 7), tenor saxophone (1), soprano saxophone (2)
 Nelson Rangell – alto saxophone (1, 3, 8), flute (3, 9), piccolo flute (9), whistling (9)
 Bobby Martin – tenor saxophone (1, 6)
 Kirk Whalum – tenor saxophone (5, 6)
 Bruce Fowler – trombone (1, 3)
 Steve Szabo – trumpet (1, 3)

Production
 Russ Freeman – producer, engineer, mixing 
 Carl Griffin – associate producer 
 Dave Grusin – executive producer 
 Larry Rosen – executive producer 
 Brant Biles – engineer, mixing 
 Robert Margouleff – engineer, mixing 
 David Hesse – additional engineer
 Joseph Doughney – post-production editing
 Michael Landay – post-production editing 
 Bernie Grundman – mastering 
 Andi Howard – production coordinator, management 
 Michele Lewis – production coordinator
 Andy Baltimore – creative director 
 David Gibb – graphic design 
 Scott Johnson – graphic design 
 Sonny Mediana – graphic design 
 Andy Ruggirello – graphic design 
 Dan Serrano – graphic design 
 Bill Mayer – front cover artwork 
 Jeff Katz – photography

Studios
 Recorded at Alpha Studios and Underwear Studios (Burbank, California); The Slam Shack (North Hollywood, California).
 Mixed at Alpha Studios
 Post-Production Editing at The Review Room (New York City, New York).
 Mastered at Bernie Grundman Mastering (Hollywood, California).

Charts

References

External links
The Rippingtons - Curves Ahead at AllMusic
The Rippingtons - Curves Ahead at Discogs
The Rippingtons Official Website

1991 albums
GRP Records albums
The Rippingtons albums